The Takedown is a French action comedy film directed by Louis Leterrier and written by Stéphane Kazandjian. It is a sequel to the 2012 film On the Other Side of the Tracks, and stars Omar Sy and Laurent Lafitte (reprising their roles from the earlier film), with Izïa Higelin. The film was released on 6 May 2022 on Netflix.

Cast
 Omar Sy as Ousmane Diakite
 Laurent Lafitte as François Monge
 Izïa Higelin as Alice Gauthier
 Dimitri Storoge as Brunner

Production
In March 2021, it was announced that Louis Leterrier would direct a French comedy-action film for Netflix.

Principal photography began on March 15, 2021 in Paris and the Rhône-Alpes region in France.

Release
The film was released by Netflix on 6 May 2022. The movie became the 7th most watched non-English language movie of all time with 78.63 million hours watched in the first 28 days of release.

References

External links
 
 

2022 films
2022 action comedy films
2020s buddy comedy films
2020s French-language films
2020s police comedy films
Films about terrorism in Europe
Films directed by Louis Leterrier
Films shot in Paris
French action comedy films
French buddy comedy films
French police films
French sequel films
French-language Netflix original films
2020s French films